Community Fridges Toronto (CFTO) is a network of public fridges with free food run by volunteers in Toronto, Ontario, Canada with the intent of providing mutual aid to those in need, such as the homeless and people with food insecurity. The network was co-created by Jalil Bokhari and his friend Julian Bentivegna to help support the homeless population in the Alexandra Park neighborhood in Toronto. As of May 2022, there are eight CFTO fridges in Toronto.

In November 2020, CFTO was forced to remove one of their public fridges in the Parkdale neighborhood by the City of Toronto due to "public safety and accessibility concerns", citing the "abandoned appliance bylaw" meant to protect children "and sanitation issues related to stopping the spread of COVID-19." After the removal, the Parkdale community moved the fridge to another location.

References 

Organizational theory
Mutualism (movement)
Social anarchism
Collectivism
Organizations based in Toronto
Socialism in Canada